Apostolou Pavlou Avenue (St. Paul's Avenue) is the busiest road artery in Paphos, Cyprus. I

The avenue connects the city center, Ktima, where the shopping and business district is, with Kato Paphos, by the coast, the tourist and entertainment center of the city. At the medieval port, "limanaki", the avenue is closed for traffic. Limanaki (little port) is the home of small restaurants, cafés, bars and small shops and Paphos Castle dominating the horizon. The last building on to the right is called "en plo" (on the water), which used to be an art gallery. B20 is the official serial number of this Avenue.

See also 
 B6 road (Cyprus)
 B8 road (Cyprus)

References 

Motorways and roads in Cyprus